Bella Dayne (born 8 January 1988) is a German actress. Her credits include the television series Plebs, Humans and the BBC/Netflix miniseries Troy: Fall of a City, in which she portrayed Helen of Troy. In 2020 she was cast in the role of Red Spear in the Netflix original show Cursed.

Early life and career 
Dayne was born as Isabelle Knispel in Berlin, where she also grew up. In 2004, at the age of 16, she took part in the Miss East Germany contest.

In 2006, while still in school, she won the Miss Germany competition. Later, she moved to New York City, attending the Stella Adler Studio of Acting. Dayne has also lived in Los Angeles, where she has had three jobs. For her acting career she chose Bella Dayne as a stage name.

Filmography

Film

Television

Web

Video games

References

External links

 

Living people
21st-century German actresses
Actresses from Berlin
German television actresses
German film actresses
German voice actresses
1988 births